Miradouro do Pico Matias Simão is a monument in the Azores. It is located in Angra do Heroísmo, on the island of Terceira.

Buildings and structures in Angra do Heroísmo